Baranya is a county in southern Hungary. It is part of the Southern Transdanubia statistical region and the historical Baranya region, which was a county (comitatus) in the Kingdom of Hungary dating back to the 11th century. Its current status as one of the 19 counties of Hungary was established in 1950 as part of wider Soviet administrative territorial reform following World War II. It is bordered by Somogy County to the northwest, Tolna County to the north, Bács-Kiskun County and the Danube to the east, and the border with Croatia (part of which is formed by the Drava River) to the south.

As of the 2011 census, it had a population of 386,441 residents. Of the 19 counties of Hungary (excluding Budapest), it is ranked 10th by both geographic area and population. Its county seat and largest city is Pécs.

Etymology 

The county was probably named after its first comes 'Brana' or 'Braina'.

Geography
This county has a total area of  – 4.76% of Hungary, it is divided in Upper Baranya and Lower Baranya.

The northern part of the county is a mountain area with large forests, the Mecsek Mountains. The central areas are shared between the Baranya Hills and Villány Mountains. The very eastern and southern parts are flat.

The highest point in the county is Zengő in the Mecsek Mountains, at 682 metres. This is also the highest point of the mountain range.

Baranya is rich in mineral and thermal water, and also in other resources. 98% of Hungary's coal resources are found here.

Neighbours
 Tolna County in the North.
 Bács-Kiskun County in the East. (across the Danube river)
 Croatia in the south (across the Drava river) – Osijek-Baranja County and Virovitica-Podravina County
 Somogy County in the Northwest.

Climate 
The climate of Baranya is a mix of continental and temperate, which makes it unique in Hungary, as the rest of the country is primarily continental. Its milder climate is due to its southern location and relative proximity to the Mediterranean Sea in comparison to other parts of the country, leaving it with warmer winters. It has the highest average annual rainfall of the Hungarian counties and a high amount of sunshine hours.

History

The area has been inhabited since ancient times. Before the Hungarian tribes conquered the area, it was inhabited by Slavs and Avars. Stephen I founded an episcopal seat here.

In 1526, the county was occupied by Ottomans and was freed in 1689. Its medieval borders remained unchanged until 1919. According to the peace treaty of Trianon, the southern part of the county reverted to Slavic rule (present-day Croatia). The re-organizing of the counties (1950) brought only minor changes (town of Szigetvár got there).

Baranya has the largest number of minorities in Hungary (more than twice the country average), providing home to 34% of the German minority the so-called Danube Swabians, and 32% of the Southern Slav minorities in Hungary.

The Stifolder or Stiffoller Shvove are a Roman Catholic subgroup of the so-called Danube Swabians. Their ancestors once came ca. 1717 - 1804 from the Hochstift Fulda and surroundings, (Roman Catholic Diocese of Fulda), and settled in the Baranya. They retained their own German dialect and culture, until the end of WW2. After WW2, the majority of Danube Swabians were expelled to allied-occupied Germany and allied-occupied Austria as a result of the Potsdam Agreement.

Only a few people can speak the old Stiffolerisch Schvovish dialect. Also a salami is named after these people.

 Electoral History

Demographics

In 2015, it had a population of 371,110 and the population density was 84/km2.

2011 census 
As of the census of 2011, there were 386,441 residents, 160,040 households, and 105,646 families living in the county. The population density was 226 inhabitants per square mile (87/km2). There were 167,453 housing units at an average density of 98 per square mile (38/km2).

There were 160,040 households, of which 63.2% were one-family households, 1.4% were multi-family households, 32.1% were one-person households, and 3.4% were other non-family households. Elderly individuals living alone were 15.9% of all households. The average household size was 2.34.

There were 105,646 families, of which 44.1% were married couples or consensual unions living together with children, 36.4% were couples without children, 16.7% were single females with children, and 2.8% were single males with children. The average family size was 2.82.

The age breakdown of the county was 20.1% under the age of 20, 7.0% between ages 20 and 24, 27.4% aged 25 to 44, 28.3% aged 45 to 64, and 17.2% aged 65 or older. The gender makeup of the county was 47.2% male and 52.8% female.

Religious adherence in the county was 46.8% Roman Catholic, 6.4% Reformed (Calvinist), 1.2% Evangelical (Lutheran), 0.3% Greek Catholic, 0.1% Orthodox, and 1.5% other religions. The non-religious were 16.2% and atheists were 1.5%, with 26.0% declining to answer.

2001 census 
As of the census of 2001, there were 407,448 residents, 151,956 households, and 115,946 families living in the county. The population density was 238 inhabitants per square mile (92/km2). There were 156,632 housing units at an average density of 92 per square mile (35/km2).

There were 151,956 households, of which 68.5% were one-family households, 3.8% were multi-family households, 24.9% were one-person households, and 2.7% were other non-family households. Elderly individuals living alone were 13.1% of all households. The average household size was 2.60.

There were 115,946 families, of which 48.7% were married couples or consensual unions living together with children, 35.4% were couples without children, 13.7% were single females with children, and 2.1% were single males with children. The average family size was 2.87.

The age breakdown of the county was 23.0% under the age of 20, 8.1% between ages 20 and 24, 28.0% aged 25 to 44, 26.0% aged 45 to 64, and 14.9% aged 65 or older. The gender makeup of the county was 47.5% male and 52.5% female.

Religious adherence in the county was 64.2% Roman Catholic, 8.7% Reformed (Calvinist), 1.5% Evangelical (Lutheran), 0.5% Greek Catholic, 0.1% Orthodox, and 0.8% other religions. The non-religious were 13.4%, with 10.8% declining to answer.

Ethnicity
Besides the Hungarian majority, the main minorities are the Germans (approx. 22,000), Roma (17,000), Croats (6,000), and Serbs (500).

Total population (2011 census): 386,441
Ethnic groups (2011 census):
Identified themselves: 364,801 persons:
Hungarians: 315,713 (86.54%)
Germans: 22,150 (6.07%)
Romani: 16,995 (4.66%)
Croats: 6,343 (1.74%)
Others and indefinable: 3,600 (0.99%)
Approx. 58,000 persons in Baranya County did not declare their ethnic group at the 2011 census.

Regional structure

Politics

County Assembly

The Baranya County Council, elected at the 2019 local government elections, is made up of 18 counselors, with the following party composition:

President of the Assembly

Members of the National Assembly
The following members elected of the National Assembly during the 2022 parliamentary election:

Municipalities

Baranya County has 1 urban county, 13 towns, 3 large villages and 284 villages. There are 301 municipalities.

Like Borsod-Abaúj-Zemplén, Baranya is a county of extremes when it comes to regional structure. The county seat is one of the five largest cities (and three largest agglomerations) of Hungary, but more than 2/3 of the municipalities are small hamlets with a population under 500. Half of the county's population lives in the county seat or in its immediate vicinity, while 22% of the population lives in villages that have less than 1000 inhabitants.

Cities with county rights
(ordered by population, as of 2011 census)
 Pécs (156,049) – county seat

Towns

 Komló (24,394)
 Mohács (17,808)
 Szigetvár (10,614)
 Siklós (9,574)
 Szentlőrinc (6,662)
 Kozármisleny (5,998)
 Pécsvárad (4,047)
 Harkány (4,010)
 Bóly (3,957)
 Sásd (3,237)
 Sellye (2,783)
 Villány (2,509)
 Mágocs (2,388)

Villages

 Abaliget
 Adorjás
 Almamellék
 Almáskeresztúr
 Alsómocsolád
 Alsószentmárton
 Apátvarasd
 Aranyosgadány
 Ág
 Áta
 Babarc
 Babarcszőlős
 Bakóca
 Bakonya
 Baksa
 Baranyahídvég
 Baranyajenő
 Baranyaszentgyörgy
 Basal
 Bánfa
 Bár
 Belvárdgyula
 Beremend 
 Berkesd
 Besence
 Bezedek
 Bicsérd
 Bikal
 Birján
 Bisse
 Boda
 Bodolyabér
 Bogdása
 Bogád
 Bogádmindszent
 Boldogasszonyfa
 Borjád
 Bosta
 Botykapeterd
 Bükkösd
 Bürüs
 Csányoszró
 Csarnóta
 Csebény
 Cserdi
 Cserkút
 Csertő
 Csonkamindszent
 Cún
 Drávacsehi
 Drávacsepely
 Drávafok
 Drávaiványi
 Drávakeresztúr
 Drávapalkonya
 Drávapiski
 Drávaszabolcs
 Drávaszerdahely
 Drávasztára
 Dencsháza
 Dinnyeberki
 Diósviszló
 Dunaszekcső
 Egerág
 Egyházasharaszti
 Egyházaskozár
 Ellend
 Endrőc
 Erdősmecske
 Erdősmárok
 Erzsébet
 Fazekasboda
 Feked
 Felsőegerszeg
 Felsőszentmárton
 Garé
 Gerde
 Geresdlak
 Gerényes
 Gilvánfa
 Gordisa
 Gyód
 Gödre
 Görcsöny
 Görcsönydoboka
 Gyöngyfa
 Gyöngyösmellék
 Hásságy
 Hegyhátmaróc
 Hegyszentmárton
 Helesfa
 Hetvehely
 Hidas
 Himesháza
 Hirics
 Hobol
 Homorúd
 Horváthertelend
 Hosszúhetény
 Husztót
 Ibafa
 Illocska
 Ipacsfa
 Ivánbattyán
 Ivándárda
 Kacsóta
 Kákics
 Kárász
 Kásád
 Kátoly
 Katádfa
 Kékesd
 Kemse
 Keresztespuszta
 Keszü
 Kémes
 Képespuszta
 Kétújfalu
 Királyegyháza
 Kisasszonyfa
 Kisbeszterce
 Kisbudmér
 Kisdobsza
 Kisdér
 Kishajmás
 Kisharsány
 Kisherend
 Kisjakabfalva
 Kiskassa
 Kislippó
 Kisnyárád
 Kisszentmárton
 Kistamási
 Kistapolca
 Kistótfalu
 Kisvaszar
 Kisújbánya
 Kovácshida
 Kovácsszénája
 Kórós
 Köblény
 Kökény
 Kölked
 Kővágószőlős
 Kővágótöttös
 Lapáncsa
 Lánycsók
 Liget
 Lippó
 Liptód
 Lothárd
 Lovászhetény
 Lúzsok
 Magyarbóly
 Magyaregregy
 Magyarhertelend
 Magyarlukafa
 Magyarmecske
 Magyarsarlós
 Magyarszék
 Magyartelek
 Majs
 Markóc
 Márok
 Martonfa
 Maráza
 Marócsa
 Matty
 Mánfa
 Márfa
 Máriakéménd
 Máza
 Mecseknádasd
 Mecsekpölöske
 Mekényes
 Merenye
 Meződ
 Mindszentgodisa
 Molvány
 Monyoród
 Mozsgó
 Nagybudmér
 Nagycsány
 Nagydobsza
 Nagyhajmás
 Nagyharsány
 Nagykozár
 Nagynyárád
 Nagypall
 Nagypeterd
 Nagytótfalu
 Nagyváty
 Nemeske
 Nyugotszenterzsébet
 Okorvölgy
 Okorág
 Olasz
 Old
 Orfű
 Oroszló
 Óbánya
 Ócsárd
 Ófalu
 Ózdfalu
 Palkonya
 Palotabozsok
 Palé
 Páprád
 Patapoklosi
 Pécsbagota
 Pécsdevecser
 Pécsudvard
 Pellérd
 Pereked
 Peterd
 Pettend
 Piskó
 Pogány
 Pócsa
 Rádfalva
 Regenye
 Romonya
 Rózsafa
 Sámod
 Sárok
 Sátorhely
 Siklósbodony
 Siklósnagyfalu
 Somberek
 Somogyapáti
 Somogyhatvan
 Somogyhárságy
 Somogyviszló
 Sósvertike
 Sumony
 Szabadszentkirály
 Szajk
 Szalatnak
 Szalánta
 Szaporca
 Szava
 Szágy
 Szárász
 Szászvár 
 Szebény
 Szederkény
 Székelyszabar
 Szellő
 Szemely
 Szentdénes
 Szentegát
 Szentkatalin
 Szentlászló
 Szilvás
 Szilágy
 Szörény
 Szőke
 Szőkéd
 Szulimán
 Szűr
 Tarrós
 Teklafalu
 Tengeri
 Tékes
 Tésenfa
 Téseny
 Tormás
 Tófű
 Tótszentgyörgy
 Töttös
 Túrony
 Udvar
 Újpetre
 Vajszló 
 Varga
 Várad
 Vásárosbéc
 Vásárosdombó
 Vázsnok
 Vejti
 Vékény
 Velény
 Véménd
 Versend
 Villánykövesd
 Vokány
 Zaláta
 Zádor
 Zengővárkony
 Zók

 municipalities are large villages.

Gallery

Notes

References

External links 
 Official site in Hungarian
 Dunántúli Napló (bama.hu) - The county portal
Hungarian Central Statistics Office

 
Counties of Hungary
Baranya (region)
History of Baranya (region)